Khartoum International Airport  (Arabic:مطار الخرطوم الدولي) is the principal airport in Khartoum, the capital of Sudan.

 
The current airport will be replaced by the New Khartoum International Airport in Omdourman 40 kilometers (25 miles) south of the centre of Khartoum in 2022. Construction is to be carried out by China Harbour Engineering Co. (CHEC). On 04 March 2021, the airport's ICAO code was changed from HSSS to HSSK.

The current airport originated as the Royal Air Force airfield Gordon's Tree. By January 1940 No. 223 Squadron RAF was located at Gordon's Tree, in the south of Khartoum. Later the area became known as El Shajjara ('the tree', of course once 'Gordon's Tree'). By January 1942 No. 71 Operational Training Unit RAF was operating from the airfield; among aircraft operated were Curtiss Tomahawks and Vickers Wellesleys. Reportedly the OTU had at one stage 50 Harvards and 20 Hurricane fighters on strength.

Sudanese independence was granted in January 1956. The last Royal Air Force flying unit reported at Khartoum was No. 8 Squadron RAF, which arrived in November 1953, and stayed until July 1956.

Airlines and destinations

Passenger

Cargo

Khartoum Air Base

The airport hosts a major Sudanese Air Force Transport Squadron:
 Antonov An-12
 Antonov An-26
 Antonov An-30
 Antonov An-32
 Antonov An-72/74
 Lockheed C-130H
 Ilyushin Il-62M - personnel transport
 Ilyushin Il-76TD strategic transport
 Dassault Falcon 50 VIP transport
 Dassault Falcon 900 VIP transport

Police Air Wing operates rotary aircraft from the base:

 Mil Mi-8
 Mil Mi-17
 SAFAT-02

Accidents and incidents
On 1 January 1942, Vickers Wellesley Mark I L2660 of No. 71 Operational Training Unit RAF was written off, damaged beyond repair, on take-off from Gordon's Tree.
On 27 August 1952, Vickers Viscount G-AHRF operated by the Ministry of Supply (United Kingdom) was damaged beyond economic repair when its starboard undercarriage collapsed on landing.
On 19 July 1983, Douglas C-47A N480F of Chevron Oil crashed shortly after take-off from Khartoum International Airport on a non-scheduled passenger flight. Both engines had failed, probably due to contaminated fuel. All 27 people on board survived.
Sudan Airways Flight 109: On 10 June 2008, an aircraft operating from Amman, Jordan, landed and went off the end of the runway. The right engine then caught fire and the fire spread rapidly. Preliminary reports stated that around 100 of the 200 passengers had been killed but this was revised to 30 dead with 184 survivors.
On 30 June 2008, an Ilyushin Il-76 exploded into a fireball on take-off. All 4 crew were killed.
On 3 October 2018 a Sudan Air Force Antonov An-32 collided with another Sudan Air Force Antonov An-30.

References

External links

Khartoum International Airport Co. Ltd. Website

Airports in Sudan
Khartoum